Calliostoma foveauxanum is a medium-sized sea snail, a marine gastropod mollusc in the family Calliostomatidae, the calliostoma top snails.

Some authors place this taxon in the subgenus Calliostoma (Maurea).

Description
The size of the shell varies between 40 mm and 65 mm.

Distribution
This marine shell occurs off New Zealand

References

 Marshall, 1995. A revision of the recent Calliostoma species of New Zealand (Mollusca:Gastropoda:Trochoidea). The Nautilus 108(4):83-127

Further reading 
 Powell A. W. B., New Zealand Mollusca, William Collins Publishers Ltd, Auckland, New Zealand 1979

External links
 Image of the holotype of the species is here: 
 

foveauxanum
Gastropods of New Zealand
Gastropods described in 1950